NASCAR: Full Throttle is a compilation album released on October 16, 2001, by Hybrid Recordings, in association with NASCAR, Turner Broadcasting System, and NBC Sports.

Track listing

Appearance in media

 “Fuel for Fire” was used as the intro song for NBC’s NASCAR broadcasts. 

 “I Can’t Drive 65 (2001 version)” was used as the song for NASCAR on NBC’s Bud Pole Award segment from 2001-2004.

Release history

See also
2001 in music
2001 in NASCAR

References

2001 compilation albums
Alternative rock compilation albums
Hard rock compilation albums
Heavy metal compilation albums
NASCAR mass media
Post-grunge compilation albums
Sports compilation albums